Onur Akdoğan (born 1 March 1994) is a Turkish-German footballer who plays as a forward. He made his 3. Liga debut on 28 September 2013.

External links
 
 

1994 births
Living people
German people of Turkish descent
German footballers
Association football forwards
Holstein Kiel players
3. Liga players
Holstein Kiel II players
FC Eintracht Norderstedt 03 players
TuS Dassendorf players